Lipocosma fonsecai is a moth in the family Crambidae. It was described by Maria Alma Solis and David Adamski in 1998. It is found in Costa Rica.

The length of the forewings is 6.4-6.7 mm. The basal fascia on the forewings are mostly white, mixed with brown scales. The antemedial, medial and subterminal fasciae are yellowish brown and the marginal line is yellowish brown. The hindwings are similarly patterned as the forewings, but there is a brown spot in the discal cell.

Etymology
The species is named in honour Mr. Gilberto Fonseca, who collected the holotype and various paratypes.

References

Glaphyriinae
Moths described in 1998